The 2023 Benue State gubernatorial election will take place on 18 March 2023, to elect the Governor of Benue State, concurrent with elections to the Benue State House of Assembly as well as twenty-seven other gubernatorial elections and elections to all other state houses of assembly. The election—which was postponed from its original 11 March date—will be held three weeks after the presidential election and National Assembly elections. Incumbent PDP Governor Samuel Ortom is term-limited and cannot seek re-election to a third term.

Party primaries were scheduled for between 4 April and 9 June 2022 with the Peoples Democratic Party nominating House of Assembly Speaker Titus Uba on 25 May while the All Progressives Congress first held its primary on 26 and 27 May nominating Hyacinth Alia—a suspended Catholic priest; however, the primary was partially annulled and a rerun was held on 9 June that was also won by Alia. Despite the initial annulment, the rerun itself was partially annulled by a Court of Appeal ruling in January 2023 which ordered the APC to hold a third primary in 11 local government areas. The new exercise, held on 2 February, resulted in a third victory for Alia.

Electoral system
The governor of Benue State is elected using a modified two-round system. To be elected in the first round, a candidate must receive the plurality of the vote and over 25% of the vote in at least two-thirds of state local government areas. If no candidate passes this threshold, a second round will be held between the top candidate and the next candidate to have received a plurality of votes in the highest number of local government areas.

Background
Benue State is a diverse, agriculture-based state in the Middle Belt; although it is nicknamed the "Food Basket of the Nation" and has vast natural resources, Benue has faced challenges in security as inter-ethnic violence and conflict between herders and farmers heavily affect the state. The overproliferation of weaponry and increased pressure for land along with failures in governance led to the worsening of these clashes in the years ahead of the election.

Politically, Benue's 2019 elections were categorized as a swing back towards the PDP in the aftermath of Ortom's 2018 defection back to the party. On the federal level, PDP nominee Atiku Abubakar narrowly won the state after Buhari had won it in 2015; legislatively, the PDP swept all three Senate seats and won seven House of Representatives seats. Statewise, Ortom won re-election by over 10% of the vote and the PDP won a majority in the House of Assembly.

During its second term, the Ortom administration's stated focuses included economic growth, stopping herder-farmer and ethnic conflicts, and infrastructural development. In terms of his performance, Ortom was commended for his proposals to end herder-farmer conflicts while being criticized for deflecting responsibility for insecurity, the initial failure of a 2019 peace meeting between Tiv and Jukun groups, a flawed COVID-19 response, his brief early 2021 spat with Bauchi State Governor Bala Mohammed which descended into ethnic gibes, a corrupt land grab, and his perceived obsession with picking fights with the federal government.

Primary elections
The primaries, along with any potential challenges to primary results, were to take place between 4 April and 3 June 2022 but the deadline was extended to 9 June. Arguments over an informal zoning gentlemen's agreement have led to disputes over whether it is the turn of the Jechira Tiv in Benue North-West Senatorial District, the Kwande Tiv in Benue North-East Senatorial District, and the Idoma in Benue South Senatorial District. The Jechira Gubernatorial Movement claims right to the governorship as they are the only Tiv subgroup to never have a Governor complete a term, some Kwande people claim right to the governorship as some activists count the Jechira Governor Moses Adasu's shortened term and thus the rotation between Tiv subgroups would start again with the Kwande, and Idoma groups claim right to the governorship as no Idoma has ever held the office.

While the major parties zoned their nominations to both a Jechira Tiv-majority area and the Idoma-majority Benue South Senatorial District, the PDP nominated a Tiv person while the APC nominee is from Benue South.

All Progressives Congress 
In early May 2022, the state party zoned its nomination to two areas: the Jechira Tiv-majority local government areas of Vandeikya and Konshisha in the North-East and the entire South Senatorial District.

Ahead of the primary, it was announced that the Benue APC would use the direct primary method to elect its nominee. However, on primary day, the absence of election officials led to long delays and the postponement of some voting to 27 May. After voting completed, Hyacinth Alia—a suspended Catholic priest—was announced as winner with over 525,000 votes, about 64% of the vote. Immediately after the results were released, several of Alia's opponents rejected the vote totals as fabricated and petitioned the party for an annulment while one candidate—MHR Herman Hembe—left the party in protest. On 4 June, the primary appeal committee released its report, recommending the primary's annulment due to the committee being unable to confirm the veracity of several results sheets; in response, the APC National Working Committee ordered a rerun primary in 12 local government areas scheduled for 9 June. In the rerun primary, Alia again came first as he won about 195,000 votes, about 72% of the vote. However, his opponents again rejected the results with Michael Aondoakaa suing the party as Barnabas Andyar Gemade blamed minister George Akume for rigging the election. Aondoakaa's lawsuit was dismissed by a Federal High Court ruling in November 2022. However, the lawsuit of another losing aspirant— Terhemba Shija—was partially successful as a Court of Appeal ruling in January 2023 nullified the primary and ordered a rerun in the 11 local government areas that were not covered by the June rerun. While the APC accepted the ruling and prepared to hold the rerun, Shija rejected it and appealed to higher courts. Despite the appeal, the party swiftly organised the rerun for 2 February with it resulting in a third Alia victory.

Nominated 
 Hyacinth Alia: suspended Catholic priest
Running mate—Sam Ode: 2019 APC deputy gubernatorial nominee and former Minister of State for Niger Delta

Eliminated in primary 
 Michael Aondoakaa: Minister of Justice and Attorney General of the Federation (2008–2010)
 Mathias Byuan: businessman
 Barnabas Andyar Gemade: former Senator for Benue North-East (2011–2019)
 Herman Hembe: House of Representatives member for Konshisha/Vandeikya (2007–present) (defected after the primary and prior to the rerun primary to successfully run in the LP gubernatorial primary)
 Godwin Ityoachimin: surveyor
 Steven Lawani: former Deputy Governor (2007–2015)
 Anyom Mlanga
 Sam Ode: 2019 APC deputy gubernatorial nominee and former Minister of State for Niger Delta
 Terwase Orbunde: former Chief of Staff to Governor Samuel Ortom
 Terhemba Shija: former Commissioner of Local Government and Chieftaincy Affairs and former House of Representatives member
 Bernard Yisa: architect

Withdrew 

 Dickson Akoh: National Commandant of the Peace Corps
 Silas Akoso
 Terlumun Akputu: former Kwande Local Government Chairman
 Joseph Alakali: professor
 Roseline Ada Chenge: 2015 PDP gubernatorial candidate
 Jacob Dzurgba: banker
 Msoo Ghasarah
 Levi Lumun Icheen: engineer and son of former House of Assembly Speaker Margaret Icheen
 Terlumun Ikya: economic consultant
 Emmanuel Jime: 2019 APC gubernatorial nominee, former House of Representatives member, former House of Assembly member, and former Speaker of the House of Assembly
 Jeff Kuraun: geologist
 John Asen Loko
 Daniel Onjeh: 2015 APC Benue South senatorial nominee and activist
 Mathias Oyigeya: doctor
 Richard Tersoo Mnenga: Universal Basic Education Commission Board member
 George Nduul: engineer
 Mark Tersoo Hanmantion: businessman
 Mcdonald Ter Tor
 Terhemen Tilley-Gyado: engineer (defected prior to the primary to successfully run in the ADC gubernatorial primary)
 John Tor Tsuwa: former Chairman of the Benue State Independent Electoral Commission
 Bem Tseen: former Kwande Local Government Chairman
 Paul Ugba Uye
 Benjamin Wayo
 Nick Wende: former Commissioner for Water Resources and Environment
 Joseph Kuhe Yashi

Results

People's Democratic Party 
On 3 February 2021, Governor Samuel Ortom ordered all his appointees to suspend their gubernatorial campaigns or resign; this directive applied to his Chief of Staff Terwase Orbunde, who had announced his run for Governor on 7 January. Orbunde suspended his campaign on 7 February. Ortom later directed any appointees preparing to run in a 2023 election to resign by 30 September; on that day, five appointees resigned with three (Orbunde, Water Resources Commissioner Dondo Ahire, and Education Commissioner Dennis Ityavyar) intending to run for governor.

On 11 July 2021, Ortom said that the Benue PDP would decide whether to zone their nomination to either Benue South or Benue North-East. This statement was a few days before meeting with PDP gubernatorial aspirants on 16 July. But in early April 2022, the state party zoned its nomination to two local government areas: the Jechira Tiv-majority Vandeikya in the North-East and the Idoma-majority Otukpo in the South with the goal of southern and north-eastern party leaders unofficially agreeing on one candidate each who would then face each other in the primary. Reportedly, the southern candidate is Deputy Governor Benson Abounu while reports stated that there was an internal rift in the Benue PDP over the unofficial north-eastern candidate as Ortom (who has publicly come out in favor of a north-eastern Tiv nominee instead of a southern Idoma nominee) backed Ityavyar while PDP National Chairman Iyorchia Ayu supported Assembly Speaker Titus Uba, party stakeholders eventually reached a decision on 18 April when it was announced that Uba would be the north-eastern candidate. However, the arrangement was controversial as some candidates derided the process as undemocratic and lacking in transparency before they bought forms anyway.

On the primary date, candidates contested an indirect primary in Makurdi that ended with Uba emerging as the PDP nominee after results showed him winning just under 90% of the delegates' votes. In his acceptance speech, Uba thanked his former opponents and party supporters. Although he accepted the results and congratulated Uba, Abounu lamented discrimination against Idoma during his own speech. A few days later, Ortom announced state PDP chairman John Ngbede would be the party's deputy gubernatorial nominee with observers noting the regional balance as Ngbede is from Benue South.

Nominated 
 Titus Uba: House of Assembly member for Kyan and Speaker of the House of Assembly (2018–present)
Running mate—John Ngbede: state PDP chairman

Eliminated in primary 
 Benson Abounu: Deputy Governor (2015–present) and former commissioner
 Ben Akaakar: engineer (defected after the primary to unsuccessfully run in the LP gubernatorial primary)
 Paul Angya: former Standards Organisation of Nigeria Director General
 Dennis Ityavyar: former Commissioner for Education
 Terkaa Ucha: House of Assembly member for Vandeikya-Tiev

Withdrew 

 Christopher Afaor: former House of Assembly member
 Adikpo Agbatse: former Executive Secretary of the Benue State Emergency Management Agency
 Dondu Ahire: former Commissioner for Water Resources and Solid Minerals
 Dominic Akahan
 Terver Akase: former Chief Press Secretary to Governor Samuel Ortom
 Donatus Doosoon Akumbur
 Julius Atorough: businessman
 Terver Atsar: engineer
 Peter Chieshe: pharmacist
 Tertsea Gbishe: House of Assembly member for Kwande East
 Chille Igbawua: former House of Representatives member for Kwande/Ushongo (2007–2011)
 Joe Ikyagba: former aide to Governor Samuel Ortom
 Isaiah Terhemen Ipevnor
 Boniface Verr Jirbo
 Patrick Ogbu: former Chairman of Nigerian Television Authority Board of Directors
 Terwase Orbunde: former Chief of Staff to Governor Samuel Ortom (defected prior to the primary to unsuccessfully run in the APC gubernatorial primary)
 Paul Orhii: former National Agency for Food and Drug Administration and Control Director-General
 Robert Orya: former Managing Director/CEO of NEXIM
 Paul Ubwa: President of the Benue Chamber of Commerce, Industry, Mines and Agriculture
 Susan Waya: socialite

Declined 
 Abba Moro: Senator for Benue North-East (2019–present) and former Minister of the Interior (2011–2015)

Results

Minor parties 

 Matthias Oyigeya (Accord)
Running mate: Atorugh Ape Elizabeth
 Matthew Asemayina Dabu (Action Alliance)
Running mate: Ochonu Francis Ochonu
 Roseline Ada Chenge (Action Democratic Party)
Running mate: Thaddeus Gwaza
 Terrumun Kenneth Kwadzah (Action Peoples Party)
Running mate: Grace Agada
 Ewaoche Benjamin Obe (African Action Congress)
Running mate: Vera Ladi Arase
 Terhemen Tilley-Gyado (African Democratic Congress)
Running mate: Sunday Okoh
 Joseph Waya (All Progressives Grand Alliance)
Running mate: Uhwana Isaac Ode
 Herman Hembe (Labour Party)
Running mate: Christopher Onyiloyi Idu
 Bem Reuben Angwe (New Nigeria Peoples Party)
Running mate: Comfort Ogbaji
 Sam Inalegwu Abah (National Rescue Movement)
Running mate: Roselyn Saalu]
 Levi Lumun Icheen (People's Redemption Party)
Running mate: Sunday Idakwo Emmanuel
 James Bemgbator Mede (Social Democratic Party)
Running mate: Ameh Ebute
 Roberts Orya (Young Progressives Party)
Running mate: Iduh Fidel Agaba
 Aondona Catherine Dabo-Adzuana (Zenith Labour Party)
Running mate: Ocheme Ogbe

Campaign
The early parts of the general election campaign focused on dealing with the aftermath of contentious party primaries. As controversy in the PDP centered around the party again refusing to choose a nominee from the Southern part of the state, Uba's post-primary reconciliation move was to pick a running mate from the region—John Ngbede from Agatu LGA. In the APC, the controversy was mainly about the conduct of the primary itself as most of Alia's opponents rejected the results as fabricated. One of these opponents, Barnabas Andyar Gemade, and his allies wrote an open letter to President Muhammadu Buhari that accused minister George Akume of imposing Alia as nominee and claimed that his continued candidacy could led to the party's disqualification. In July 2022, Uba attempted to capitalize on the APC crisis by asking a court to disqualify Alia based on the claims of his intraparty opponents.

Immediately after the primaries, observers noted the peculiarity of Alia's candidacy due to his occupation as a Catholic priest. He drew comparisons with former Governor Moses Adasu, who was also a Catholic priest. While it was also noted that the Church suspended Alia from the priesthood in May 2022, analysts said his profession was a major part of his primary campaign and Alia himself said that he was deciding "to extend it [the gospel] to governance." By January 2023, observers continued focus on Alia's popularity but noted the power of incumbency benefiting Uba. On the other hand, Uba's weeks-long medical vacation removed him from campaigning and led to questions on his fitness to govern. Reporting also pointed out other potential factors such as legal cases against Alia's nomination and insecurity along with the more prominent minor party nominees—Joseph Waya (APGA), Herman Hembe (LP), and Bem Angwe (NNPP). Later that month, discussion on the potential impact of challenges to the APC primary proved accurate as a Court of Appeal ruling partially nullified the party's primary and ordered a rerun in 11 local government areas. However, the third primary simply resulted in another Alia victory and the continuation of his general election campaign.

Later in February, focus switched to the nearing presidential election on 25 February. In the election, Benue voted for Bola Tinubu (APC); Tinubu won the state with 40.3% of the vote, beating Peter Obi (LP) at 40.0% and Atiku Abubakar (PDP) at 16.9%. Aside from the presidential result—which itself was a surprise as projections favored Obi, the senatorial elections had another surprise with Ortom losing to the APC in the North-West district. These two results, coupled with Ortom's low approval compared to Alia's popularity, led analysts in later February and early March to focus on Alia's rising chances. Additionally, the presidential result pushed journalists to label Hembe as a major candidate, considering the high votal of Obi.

Projections

Conduct

Electoral timetable

General election

Results

By senatorial district 
The results of the election by senatorial district.

By federal constituency
The results of the election by federal constituency.

By local government area 
The results of the election by local government area.

See also 
 2023 Nigerian elections
 2023 Nigerian gubernatorial elections

Notes

References 

Benue State gubernatorial election
2023
2023 Benue State elections
Benue